The Face Vietnam season 1 is a Vietnamese modeling-themed reality television series, based on the US television series of the same name, and one of several national editions in the international The Face franchise. Hồ Ngọc Hà, Phạm Hương and Lan Khuê served as model coaches and Vĩnh Thụy served as a host for the first season. The first season premiered on 18 June 2016 on VTV3.

Contestants 
(Ages stated are at start of filming)

Episodes

Episode 1 
First aired 18 June 2016

Team Hồ Ngọc Hà : Tô Uyên Khánh Ngọc, Phí Phương Anh, Chúng Huyền Thanh, Lê Thị Ngân Hà “Lê Hà”, Lilly Nguyễn.
Team Phạm Hương : Đỗ Trần Khánh Ngân, Diệp Linh Châu, Trần Thị Ngọc Loan, Nguỵ Thiên An “An Nguy”, Nguyễn Thị Thành.
Team Lan Khuê : Ngô Thị Quỳnh Mai “Mai Ngô”, Lê Thị Ngọc Út “Bảo Ngọc”, Trần Thị Kim Chi, Nguyễn Thu Hiền, Nguyễn Thị My Lê.
 Special guest: Tóc Tiên

Episode 2 
First aired 25 June 2016

Team Hồ Ngọc Hà : Phí Phương Anh, Chúng Huyền Thanh, Lê Thị Ngân Hà “Lê Hà”, Lilly Nguyễn.
Team Phạm Hương : Đỗ Trần Khánh Ngân, Diệp Linh Châu, Trần Thị Ngọc Loan, Nguỵ Thiên An “An Nguy”.
Team Lan Khuê : Ngô Thị Quỳnh Mai “Mai Ngô”, Lê Thị Ngọc Út “Bảo Ngọc”, Trần Thị Kim Chi, Nguyễn Thu Hiền.
 Eliminated: Tô Uyên Khánh Ngọc, Nguyễn Thị Thành & Nguyễn Thị My Lê

Episode 3 
First aired 2 July 2016

 Winning coach and team:  Phạm Hương
 Bottom two: Lê Thị Ngọc Út “Bảo Ngọc” & Chúng Huyền Thanh
 Eliminated: Lê Thị Ngọc Út “Bảo Ngọc”
 Special guest: Mai Phương Thúy

Episode 4 
First aired 9 July 2016

 Winning coach and team:  Hồ Ngọc Hà
 Bottom two: Nguỵ Thiên An “An Nguy” & Ngô Thị Quỳnh Mai “Mai Ngô”
 Eliminated: Nguỵ Thiên An “An Nguy”
 Special guest: Jay L Lingeswara

Episode 5 
First aired 16 July 2016

 Winning coach and team:  Phạm Hương
 Bottom two: Lilly Nguyễn & Nguyễn Thu Hiền
 Eliminated: Nguyễn Thu Hiền
 Special guest: Thụy Vi, Trần Ngọc Nhật, Richard Mehr, Thoại Yến, Anh Thư, Nguyễn Bích Trâm, Quân Ngọc, Lê Minh Ngọc, Nhật Bình, Nguyễn Danh Quý, MLee, Chung Thanh Phong, Travis Nguyễn, Kelbin Lei, Nguyễn Thanh Hưởng, Hensi Lê, Tuấn Trần, Yến Trang, Yến Nhi, Nguyễn Vũ Sơn, ST, Khánh My, Thu Thủy, Hà Thanh Huy, Hùng Lâm, Trác Thúy Miêu, Trương Ngọc Tình, Phúc Nguyễn, Ngọc Phú, Đoàn Tùng

Episode 6 
First aired 23 July 2016

 Winning coach and team:  Phạm Hương
 Bottom two: Lê Thị Ngân Hà “Lê Hà” & Trần Thị Kim Chi
 Eliminated: Trần Thị Kim Chi
 Special guest: Nguyễn Ngọc Thụy, Tạ Nguyên Phúc, Christian Mark Jacobs, Châu Đăng Khoa, Nguyễn Tuấn Kiệt, Huỳnh Anh, Hoàng Oanh, Hương Tràm, Trương Minh Cường, Thu Hoài, Trịnh Thăng Bình, Tân Thế Giới, Vân Shi, Diệu Hân, Trà Linh, Yamanouchi Masatoshi, Theron Thanh, Tuấn Trấn, Trương Quỳnh Anh, Diệu Huyền, Randy G.Dobson, Anh Thư, Minh Trung, Nathan Lee, Hoàng Ngân, Khánh Vy, Đại Ngô, Lê Thanh Hoà, Diệu Ngọc

Episode 7 
First aired 30 July 2016

 Winning coach and team:  Lan Khuê
 Bottom two: Phí Phương Anh & Diệp Linh Châu
 Eliminated: Diệp Linh Châu
 Special guest: Tóc Tiên, Trường Huỳnh Diễm Chi

Episode 8 
First aired 6 August 2016

 Winning coach and team:  Lan Khuê
 Bottom two: Lilly Nguyễn & Trần Thị Ngọc Loan
 Eliminated: Lilly Nguyễn
 Special guest: Nguyễn Văn Sơn

Episode 9 
First aired 13 August 2016

 Winning coach and team:  Hồ Ngọc Hà
 Bottom two: Trần Thị Ngọc Loan & Ngô Thị Quỳnh Mai “Mai Ngô”
 Eliminated: Trần Thị Ngọc Loan
 Special guest: Tóc Tiên, BTV Minh Quang, BTV Lê Phát, PV Vân An, PV Quang Phong, PV Quỳnh Trang, PV Phương Giang

Episode 10 
First aired 20 August 2016

 Winning coach and team:  Phạm Hương
 Bottom two: Ngô Thị Quỳnh Mai “Mai Ngô” & Chúng Huyền Thanh
 Eliminated: Ngô Thị Quỳnh Mai “Mai Ngô”
 Eliminated coach: Lan Khuê
 Special guest: John Cook

Episode 11 
First aired 27 August 2016

 Winning coach and team:  Hồ Ngọc Hà
 Bottom three: Đỗ Trần Khánh Ngân , Chúng Huyền Thanh & Lê Thị Ngân Hà “Lê Hà” 
 Eliminated: Lê Thị Ngân Hà “Lê Hà”
 Special guest:  ST, Tóc Tiên, Noo Phước Thịnh

Episode 12 

First aired 3 September 2016
 Winning coach and team:  Hồ Ngọc Hà
 Returned: Ngô Thị Quỳnh Mai “Mai Ngô”
 Final four: Phí Phương Anh, Chúng Huyền Thanh, Đỗ Trần Khánh Ngân & Ngô Thị Quỳnh Mai “Mai Ngô”
 The Face Vietnam 2016: Phí Phương Anh
 Special guest: S-Girls, Nguyễn Văn Sơn, Lưu Hương Giang, Tóc Tiên, Sơn Tùng M-TP

Summaries

Elimination table

 The contestant was part of the winning team for the episode.
 The contestant was at risk of elimination.
 The contestant was eliminated from the competition.
 The contestant was originally eliminated but returned to the competition.
 The contestant was a runner-up.
 The contestant won The Face.

 Episode 1 was the casting episode. The final fifteen were divided into teams of five as they were selected.
 In episode 2, Hồ Ngọc Hà, Phạm Hương and Lan Khuê were asked to choose any one contestant to eliminate from their team. Hồ Ngọc Hà chose Khánh Ngọc, Phạm Hương chose Nguyễn Thị Thành, and Lan Khuê chose My Lê. 
 In episode 4, team Hồ Ngọc Hà won the campaign. Lan Khuê nominated Quỳnh Mai while Phạm Hương nominated Thiên An for elimination. The episode ended in a cliffhanger and their fate remained unknown until the beginning of episode 5.
 In episode 11, team Hồ Ngọc Hà won the campaign. Hồ Ngọc Hà nominated Lê Hà and Huyền Thanh for elimination with Khánh Ngân, and chose to eliminate Lê Hà.
 In episode 12, Quỳnh Mai returned to the competition after winning a popular vote out of the previously eliminated contestants.

Campaigns
 Episode 1: Natural beauty and street style (casting)
 Episode 2: Catwalk for swimsuits and dress by Chung Thanh Phong designer (casting)
 Episode 3: Apollo silicone commercial shoot
 Episode 4: VietJet campaign
 Episode 5: Runway party table
 Episode 6: Bridal runway show
 Episode 7: Gender reversal for L'Oréal Paris
 Episode 8: TVC filming with male models
 Episode 9: Press conference for OPPO
 Episode 10: Apolo Silicone TVC filming
 Episode 11: OPPO TVC filming
 Episode 12: Final walk

References 

List of broadcasts of Vietnam Television (VTV)

2016 Vietnamese television seasons